Tapetum (Latin for carpet or tapestry) can refer to:

 Tapetum (botany), tissue within the sporangium (especially the anther), which provides nutrition for growing spores . The innermost wall of microsporangium
 Tapetum lucidum, a reflective tissue layer associated with the retina of some vertebrates
 Tapetum of corpus callosum, a section of the corpus callosum in the brain